Lady Frankin may refer to:

 Jane Franklin (1791–1875), Tasmanian pioneer and second wife of the explorer Sir John Franklin

Buildings
 Jane Franklin Hall, a residential college in Hobart, Tasmania, Australia
 Lady Franklin Gallery, a historic sandstone museum in Lenah Valley, Tasmania, Australia

Geography
 Lady Franklin Bay, Ellesmere Island, Nunavut, Canada
 Lady Franklin Island, Davis Strait, Nunavut, Canada
 Lady Franklin Point, Nunavut, Canada
 Lady Franklin Rock, an island in the Fraser River above Yale, British Columbia, Canada

Ships
 Lady Franklin (ship), a Canadian ice-strengthened cargo vessel chartered by the Australian Antarctic Division after the 1987 scuttling of the Nella Dan
 Lady Franklin (schooner), a ship that went missing near Tasmania in 1838

See also 
 "Lady Franklin's Lament", an Australian folk ballad 
 Lady Franklin's Revenge, a 2005 history of the exploration of the Arctic by Ken McGoogan
 Lady Franklinfjorden, a fjord in Arctic Norway